Guo Qiusen (Hepburn: Kaku Shūsei) (1904–1980), born in Japanese Taiwan in the area of Taihoku (modern-day Xinzhuang, New Taipei, Taiwan), was a Taiwanese writer. He wrote under the pseudonym Qiusen. He was a strong supporter of the language movement started by Huang Shihui.

References 

20th-century Taiwanese writers
1904 births
1980 deaths
Writers from New Taipei
Taiwanese male writers